Allen Collier (born 23 March 1951) is a New Zealand cricketer. He played in three first-class matches for Northern Districts in 1976/77.

See also
 List of Northern Districts representative cricketers

References

External links
 

1951 births
Living people
New Zealand cricketers
Northern Districts cricketers
People from Paeroa
Cricketers from Waikato